Westminster is a suburb approximately 12 kilometres north of Perth, Western Australia. Its local government area is the City of Stirling.

Westminster was formerly the southern part of Balga but was renamed in 1995 at the request of residents. This was the name of the original estate that existed before residential subdivision. Between 1936 and 1955, a limestone road named "Westminster Boulevard" passed through the area.

Westminster is served by a small shopping centre, Stirling Central. The area is home to public and private primary schools and also contains a number of recreational areas. Regular bus services serve Westminster along Wanneroo Road and through the middle of the suburb.

The suburb is served by a number of Transperth bus routes operated by Path Transit and Swan Transit - including the 371, 375, 386 and 415 routes.

References 

Suburbs of Perth, Western Australia
Suburbs in the City of Stirling